Poplar was a local government district in the metropolitan area of London, England. It was formed as a district of the Metropolis in 1855 and became a metropolitan borough in the County of London in 1900. It comprised Poplar, Millwall, Bromley-by-Bow and Bow as well as Old Ford, Fish Island and Cubitt Town.

Formation and boundaries
The borough bordered the metropolitan boroughs of Hackney, Stepney, and Bethnal Green to the west and north, and the county borough of West Ham then in Essex to the east. To the south, the River Thames formed borders with the metropolitan boroughs of Bermondsey, Deptford and Greenwich.

It was formed from three civil parishes: St Mary Stratford-le-Bow, St Leonard Bromley and All Saints Poplar. In 1907 these three were combined into a single civil parish called Poplar Borough, which was conterminous with the metropolitan borough. In 1965 the parish and borough were abolished, with their former area becoming part of the newly formed London Borough of Tower Hamlets.

It included the districts of (from north to south):

Bow
Bromley St Leonard
Poplar
Blackwall
Isle of Dogs

History

In 1921 the Borough Council, under George Lansbury and the Poor Law Union were engaged in a dispute with the London County Council and central government over poor law rates - it wished to pay out of work people more than usually permitted; and to get wealthier West End boroughs to contribute to its expenses.  Several councillors were imprisoned briefly in 1921 in relation to this.  See Poplar Rates Rebellion.

In 1951 Poplar was chosen as the site of the Festival of Britain's 'Exhibition of Live Architecture'. The East End of London had been heavily bombed during the war and its reconstruction was showcased at the new Lansbury Estate. New building materials and planning concepts were demonstrated. The first example of 'live architecture' on the exhibition trail was the Trinity Congregational Church and Hall, just across from the main reception area with their Town Planning and Building Research Pavilions on East India Dock Road. The trail continued with the Lansbury Estate and Chrisp Street Market.

The former Poplar Town Hall in Bow Road, designed by Culpin & Son (1937–38), is now a listed building, as is its predecessor (1870) in Poplar High Street.

Population and area
The population as given in the census from 1801 to 1961 was:

Constituent parishes 1801-1899

Metropolitan Borough 1900-1961

Borough seal

The borough had no coat of arms, using instead a seal originally designed for the Poplar District Board of Works, its predecessor, created by the Metropolis Management Act 1855. The seal depicted the emblems of the three parish vestries merged into the board.

The top shield was the seal of Poplar Vestry, and showed the 'Hibbert Gate' of the old West India Docks, with a sailing ship on top of the shield. A similar representation of the gate and ship formed the head of the vestry's civic mace, which was used by the board of works and borough council until 1965. The model ship from atop the gate, which was demolished in 1932, was placed by the borough council in Poplar Recreation Ground and Poplar Library before it collapsed.

The shield on the left was the seal of Bow Vestry, and showed a bridge between two bows. This represented the bow-shaped bridge over the River Lea.

The shield on the right was the seal of Bromley St Leonard Vestry, and depicts the saint dressed as a bishop.

There remain a number of street signs which have been preserved with the name of the former borough.

Politics

Under the Metropolis Management Act 1855 any parish that exceeded 2,000 ratepayers was to be divided into wards; however the parishes of Poplar District Board of Works did not exceed this number so were not divided into wards.

In 1880 the population had increased enough for the parish of All Saints Poplar to be divided into three wards (electing vestrymen): South (27), East (27) and West (30).

In 1885 the population had increased enough for the parish of Bromley St Leonard to also be divided into three wards (electing vestrymen): West (39), East (36) and South (33).

In 1894 the population had increased enough for the parish of St Mary Stratford Bow to be divided into four wards (electing vestrymen): No. 1 (15), No. 2 (15), No. 3 (36) and No. 4 (18).

In 1894 as its population had increased the parish of All Saints Poplar was re-divided into four wards (electing vestrymen): Cubitt Town (15), Millwall (15), Blackwall (24) and West India Dock (30).

The metropolitan borough was divided into fourteen wards for elections: Bow Central, Bow North, Bow South, Bow West, Bromley Central, Bromley North East, Bromley North West, Bromley South East, Bromley South West, Cubitt Town, Millwall, Poplar East, Poplar North West and Poplar West.

Borough council

Parliament constituency
For elections to Parliament, the borough was divided into two constituencies:
Tower Hamlets, Bow and Bromley division
Tower Hamlets, Poplar division
In 1918 the boundaries of the borough's two seats were adjusted, and one was renamed:
Bow and Bromley
Poplar South
In 1950 the borough's representation was reduced to one seat:
Poplar

See also
London Government Act 1899
Metropolis Management Act 1855

References

Further reading

External links
Official Guide to the Metropolitan Borough of Poplar, 1927 
Poplar Town Hall on the Port Cities website
Vision of Britain: Population tables for Poplar Borough

Districts (Metropolis)
Metropolitan boroughs of the County of London
1855 establishments in England 
1900 disestablishments in England 
1900 establishments in England

1965 disestablishments in England 
Districts abolished by the London Government Act 1963
History of the London Borough of Tower Hamlets
Metropolitan Borough of